Teotlalco (municipality) is a town and municipality in Puebla in south-eastern Mexico.

Wife of the emperor Moctezuma II was also named Teotlalco.

References

Municipalities of Puebla